The borlotti bean is a variety of common bean (Phaseolus vulgaris) first bred in Colombia as the cargamanto. It is also known as the cranberry bean, Roman bean, romano bean (not to be confused with the Italian flat bean, a green bean also called "romano bean"), saluggia bean, gadhra bean or rosecoco bean. The bean is a medium to large tan or hazelnut-colored bean splashed or streaked with red, magenta or black.

Saluggia beans are regional, a borlotti bean named after Saluggia in northern Italy for marketing purposes and where they have been grown since the early 1900s.

Characteristics
The borlotti bean is a variety of the cranberry bean bred in Italy to have a thicker skin. It is used in Italian, Portuguese (Catarino bean), Turkish, and Greek cuisine.

The cranberry bean looks similar to the pinto bean, but cranberry beans are larger and have big maroon, magenta, or black specks on a creamy white background, more like Great Northern beans. After cooking, however, the specks vanish and the beans take on a more even, darker color.

A new cranberry bean variety, 'Crimson', is light tan speckled with maroon. It is resistant to viruses and has a high yield.

Cultivars

References

Phaseolus